José María Defilippi (born March 26, 1982 in Posadas, Argentina) is an Argentine footballer.

Teams 
  Colón de Santa Fe 2000–2002
  Crucero del Norte 2003
  Atlético Candelaria 2004–2005
  C.A.I. 2005–2007
  Atlanta 2008
  Patronato de Paraná 2008
  3 de Febrero 2009–2010
  Jorge Gibson Brown 2010–2013
  Rosamonte Apóstoles 2013
  Guaraní Antonio Franco 2013
  Chaco For Ever 2014
  Tigers FC 2015
  Sportivo Patria 2016–2017
  Stintino 2018
  Tigers FC  2019
  Atlético Posadas 2020
  A.S.D. SantaCristinese 2021                       
  Canberra Croatia FC 2022

External links
 Profile at BDFA
 

1982 births
Living people
Argentine footballers
Argentine expatriate footballers
Comisión de Actividades Infantiles footballers
Club Atlético Atlanta footballers
Club Atlético Patronato footballers
Expatriate footballers in Paraguay
Association football midfielders
People from Posadas, Misiones
Sportspeople from Misiones Province